Denis Herard  (born March 28, 1944) is a politician from Alberta, Canada, and is the former Progressive Conservative Association of Alberta MLA for Calgary-Egmont. He is French-Canadian, with fore-fathers coming majorly from Quebec.

Herard was first elected to the Legislative Assembly of Alberta in the 1993 Alberta general election. He served four terms as a back bench MLA for the Progressive Conservatives. On April 6, 2006 Herard was sworn into the Executive Council of Alberta as the Minister of Advanced Education after Lyle Oberg was asked to leave caucus.

In late 2007, Herard announced he would not seek re-election in the next provincial election.

References

External links
Denis Herard biography, Alberta Legislative Assembly

1944 births
Living people
Franco-Albertan people
Members of the Executive Council of Alberta
Politicians from Calgary
Politicians from Edmonton
Progressive Conservative Association of Alberta MLAs
21st-century Canadian politicians